Onthophagus orpheus is a species of dung beetle in the family Scarabaeidae.

Subspecies
These three subspecies belong to the species Onthophagus orpheus:
 Onthophagus orpheus canadensis (Fabricius, 1801)
 Onthophagus orpheus orpheus (Panzer, 1794)
 Onthophagus orpheus pseudorpheus HOWDEN & CARTWRIGHT, 1963

References

Further reading

 

Scarabaeinae
Articles created by Qbugbot
Beetles described in 1794